Dirac hole theory is a theory in quantum mechanics, named after English theoretical physicist Paul Dirac. The theory poses that the continuum of negative energy states, that are solutions to the Dirac equation, are filled with electrons, and the vacancies in this continuum (holes) are manifested as positrons with energy and momentum that are the negative of those of the state. The discovery of the positron in 1929 gave a considerable support to the Dirac hole theory.

While Enrico Fermi, Niels Bohr and Wolfgang Pauli were skeptical about the theory, other physicists, like Guido Beck and Kurt Sitte, made use of Dirac hole theory in alternative theories of beta decay. Gian Wick extended Dirac hole theory to cover neutrinos, introducing the anti-neutrino as a hole in a neutrino Dirac sea.

References

Dirac equation
Paul Dirac